Journal of Infrastructure Development is a forum for discussion on infrastructure policy, given that in most developing countries, infrastructure is as much related to policy as it is to markets. JOI provides a platform for healthy trade and debate regarding new ideas in the infrastructure sector.

It is published twice a year by SAGE Publications in association with India Development Foundation.

Abstracting and indexing 
 Journal of Infrastructure Development is abstracted and indexed in:
 Research Papers in Economics (RePEc) 
 DeepDyve
 Portico
 Dutch-KB
 EBSCO
 OCLC
 J-Gate

External links
 
 Homepage

References
 http://idfresearch.org/

SAGE Publishing academic journals
Biannual journals
Development studies journals
Publications established in 2009